Harry Allen may refer to:

Science
Sir Harry Brookes Allen (1854–1926), Australian pathologist
Harry W. Allen (1892–1981), American entomologist
Harry Julian Allen (1910–1977), NASA engineer and administrator

Sports
Harry Allen (footballer, born 1866) (1866–1895), Wolverhampton Wanderers and England footballer
Harry Allen (footballer, born 1879) (1879–1939), English footballer for Derby County and Leicester Fosse
Harry Allen (Australian footballer) (1890–1978), Australian rules footballer
Harry Allen (cricketer) (born 1996), English cricketer
Harry Allen (golfer) (1876–1924), American golfer
Harry Allen (ice hockey) (1923–1990), Canadian ice hockey player
, 1903 US Open mixed doubles champion
Harry Allen (bowls), Canadian lawn bowls international

Other
Harry Allen (Ontario politician) (1889–1963), provincial politician in Ontario, Canada
Harry Allen (journalist) (born 1964), hip-hop journalist, activist, and associate of Public Enemy
Harry Allen (musician) (born 1966), jazz tenor saxophonist
Harry Cranbrook Allen (1917–1998), British historian
Harry Epworth Allen (1894–1958), British painter
Harry Allen (actor) (1883–1951), Australian actor in California Straight Ahead!
Harry Allen (executioner) (1911–1992), hangman, one of the last British executioners
Harry Allen (designer) (born 1964), American industrial and interior designer
Harry Allen (trans man) (1882–1922), pioneer period Pacific Northwest transgender man
Harry K. Allen (1872–1959), Kansas State Senator, Dean of Washburn University School of Law and a Justice of the Kansas Supreme Court

See also
 Allen (surname)
 Harrison Allen (1841–1897), American physician and anatomist
 Harold Allen (disambiguation)
 Harry Allan (disambiguation)
 Henry Allan (disambiguation)
 Henry Allen (disambiguation)